Texas Dandy (born 1942) was a Quarter Horse stallion who not only raced well, and sired outstanding broodmares, he was a movie star also.

Life

Texas Dandy was a 1942 sorrel stallion registered as number 2112 with the American Quarter Horse Association (or AQHA). His sire was My Texas Dandy #4900, and his dam was Streak #612. He was bred by R. C. Tatum of Junction, Texas and owned by W. A. Northington of Egypt, Texas when he was registered with the AQHA. His sire was inbred to *Porte Drapeau, an imported Thoroughbred stallion. His dam was a daughter of one of the many unregistered Lone Stars, this one being the one sired by Gold Enamel, a Thoroughbred.

Racing career 
Texas Dandy raced for three years, with fourteen starts to his credit. He won three times, came in second once, and third once. He received a Race Register of Merit in 1947 with an A speed rating. He earned a total of $61.00 in race earnings.

Film career 
Texas Dandy was an early ambassador for the Quarter Horse breed when he co-starred in Boy From Indiana a 1950 film. The movie's story involved a farmboy from Indiana who started working for a Quarter Horse trainer in Arizona and ended up as the trainer's main jockey. The real problem in the movie was getting the finish filmed, as it called for the Quarter Horse, played by Texas Dandy, to beat a Thoroughbred race horse by a nose in a match race. It was to be filmed up close, by filming from a truck on the racetrack. However, Texas Dandy ran past the truck at least three times before he was finally tired enough to allow the Thoroughbred to come close to finishing with him.

Breeding record 
Besides starring in movies, Texas Dandy also was a noted sire. Many of his offspring earned Race Register of Merits with the AQHA, and he also sired three AQHA Champions – Little Egypt, Echols' Dandy, and Front Row. His daughter Dandy Doll was the dam of Doc Bar.

Death and honors 
Texas Dandy was 28 years old when he died in 1970, and he was inducted into the AQHA Hall of Fame in 1995.

Pedigree

Notes

References

 All Breed Pedigree Database Pedigree of Texas Dandy accessed on June 30, 2007
 AQHA Hall of Fame accessed on September 2, 2017

External links
 Texas Dandy at Quarter Horse Directory
 The Boy from Indiana Page from Internet Movie Database
 Texas Dandy at Quarter Horse Legends

American Quarter Horse racehorses
American Quarter Horse sires
1942 racehorse births
AQHA Hall of Fame (horses)